The Vilayet of Janina, Yanya or Ioannina was a first-level administrative division (vilayet) of the Ottoman Empire, established in 1867. It was created by merging the Pashalik of Yanina and the Pashalik of Berat with the sanjaks of Janina, Berat, Ergiri, Preveze, Tırhala and Kesriye. Kesriye was later demoted to kaza and bounded to Monastir Vilayet and Tırhala was given to Greece in 1881.

History

Greek National Movement in Epirus

Although part of the local population contributed greatly to the Greek War of Independence (1821–1830) the region of Epirus did not become part of the Greek state that time. In 1878, a rebellion broke out with the revolutionaries, mostly Epirotes, taking control of Sarandë and Delvinë. However, it was suppressed by the Ottoman troops, who burned 20 villages of the region.

In the following year, the Greek population of Ioannina region authorized a committee in order to present to the European governments their wish for union with Greece.

In 1906 the organization Epirote Society was founded by members of the Epirote diaspora, Panagiotis Danglis and Spyros Spyromilios, that aimed at the annexation of the region to Greece by supplying local Greeks with firearms.

Albanian National Awakening

Janina Vilayet was one of the main centers of the cultural and political life of Albanians who lived in Janina Vilayet and Monastir Vilayet. One of the most important reasons was the influence by Greek education and culture south-Albanian writers received in the famous Greek school of Ioannina, the Zosimaia. Abdyl Frashëri, the first political ideologue of the Albanian National Awakening was one of the six deputies from Janina Vilayet in the first Ottoman Parliament in 1876–1877. Abdyl Frashëri, from Frashër, modern Albania, together with Mehmet Ali Vrioni from Berat (also in modern Albania), and some members of Ioannina's Albanian community, founded the Albanian Committee of Janina in May 1877. Frashëri fought against decisions of the Treaty of San Stefano. However, the League of Prizren, was primarily Muslim Albanian, while the local Orthodox Christians felt more sympathy to the Greek cause.

End of Ottoman rule
During the Albanian Revolt of 1912 Janina Vilayet was proposed as one of four vilayets consisting Albanian Vilayet. The Ottoman government ended the Albanian revolts by accepting almost all demands of Albanian rebels on September 4, 1912, which included the formation of the vilayet later in 1912.

Following the First Balkan War of 1912–1913 and the Treaty of London the southern part of the vilayet, including Ioannina, was incorporated into Greece. Greece had also seized northern Epirus during the Balkan Wars, but the Treaty of Bucharest, which concluded the Second Balkan War, assigned Northern Epirus to Albania.

Demographics 
The vilayet of Janina was ethnically, linguistically and culturally diverse.

There have been a number of estimates about the ethnicity and the religious affiliation of the local population. The Ottoman Empire classified and counted its citizens according to religion and not ethnicity, which led to inefficient censuses and lack of classification of populations according to their ethnic groups. The vilayet was predominantly inhabited by Albanians and Greeks, while the major religions were Islam and Christian Orthodoxy. The districts of Janina which were later incorporated into Greece were heavily Greek.

According to the 1890/91 Ottoman Yearly report, the vilayet of Janina had 512,812 inhabitants, of which 44% were Muslims, 48% were orthodox Christians 7% were Aromanians, and 0.7% were Jewish. Orthodox Albanians constituted for 52% of the Orthodox population, whilst Greeks constituted 48% of the Orthodox population. Albanians accounted for 69% of the population whilst Greeks accounted for 23% of it.

According to Aram Andonyan and Zavren Biberyan in 1908 of a total population of 648,000, 315,000 inhabitants were Albanians, most of which were Muslims and Orthodox, and some who were adherents of Roman Catholicism. Aromanians and Greeks were about 180,000 and 110,000 respectively. Smaller communities included Bulgarians, Turks, Romanis and Jews.

According to Michail Sakellariou of a total population of 550,000 the Greeks were the most numerous at 300,000, Albanians second at 210,000, and there were also 25,000 Aromanians and 3,000 Jews. The sanjaks of Janina, Preveza and Gjirokastër were predominantly Greek, the sanjak of Igoumenitsa (then Gümeniçe, Reşadiye between 1909 and 1913 due to honour of Mehmet V, Ottoman Sultan) had a slight majority of Greeks, and that of Berat north was predominantly Albanian. According to Sakellariou, the official Ottoman statistics in the Vilayet of Janina had the tendency to favor the Albanian element at the expense of the Greek one.

According to Sir Hamilton Alexander Rosskeen Gibb in 1895 there were  c. 224,000 Muslims. The Orthodox population included c. 118,000 Greeks (partly of Albanian origin, Hellenized over a century by Greek religious and educational institutions) and c. 129,500 Albanians, and the Jewish population amounted to 3,500 people. According to Zafer Golen two-thirds of the population were Albanian Muslims, while according to Dimitrios Chasiotis c. 419,403 of the total population were Greeks, along with 239,000 Turks and Albanians, and 6,000 Jews. Lontos estimated that 3/4 of the population was Christian.

Administrative divisions
Sanjaks of the Vilayet:
 Sanjak of Ioannina (Yanya, Aydonat, Filat, Maçova, Leskovik, Koniçe)
 Sanjak of Ergiri (Ergiri, Delvine, Sarandoz, Premedi, Fraşer, Tepedelen, Kurvelesh, Himara)
 Sanjak of Preveze (Preveze, Loros, Margliç)
 Sanjak of Berat (Berat, Avlonya, Loşine, Fir)

See also
 Pashalik of Yanina
 Pashalik of Berat

Sources

References

External links
 
 

 
States and territories disestablished in 1913
Vilayets of the Ottoman Empire in Europe
Ottoman Greece
Ottoman Albania
Ottoman Epirus
1867 establishments in the Ottoman Empire
1913 disestablishments in the Ottoman Empire